Johan Tobias Carlsson (born 25 February 1975) is a retired Swedish footballer who played as a defender. His last club was Kalmar FF in Allsvenskan.

Honours and awards
Kalmar FF
Allsvenskan: 2008
Svenska Cupen: 2007
Svenska Supercupen: 2009

References

External links

Fotbolltransfers profile

Living people
1975 births
Swedish footballers
Kalmar FF players
Molde FK players
Allsvenskan players
Eliteserien players
Swedish expatriate footballers
Expatriate footballers in Norway
Swedish expatriate sportspeople in Norway
Association football defenders
Färjestadens GoIF players